The US Cooperative for International Patient Programs (USCIPP) is an organizational membership program of the National Center for Healthcare Leadership (NCHL), a Chicago-based nonprofit. USCIPP is composed of US academic medical centers, hospitals, and health systems that operate in the international patient care and global healthcare collaborations market.

Founded in 2010 with support from the International Trade Administration's Market Development Cooperator Program, the consortium now represents nearly 60 US healthcare provider organizations. USCIPP's members work together to increase the global competitiveness of US hospitals, expand international access to US medical expertise, conduct research and market analysis on international trade in healthcare services, and facilitate the interorganizational sharing of best practices in caring for international patients as well as in executing collaborative healthcare projects outside of the US. While all of USCIPP's member institutions share a focus on providing care to international patients who travel to the US for treatment, the majority of its members also engage in non-patient international collaborations, such as cross-border education programs, providing management services to organizations in other countries, offering consulting services to hospitals and governments abroad, and/or engaging in international, joint clinical research.	

Member Organizations:

Ann & Robert H. Lurie Children's Hospital of Chicago
Atrium Health
Baptist Health South Florida
Baylor St. Luke's Medical Center
Boston Children's Hospital
Brigham Health/Dana-Farber Cancer Institute
Broward Health International
Cancer Treatment Centers of America
Cedars-Sinai
Children's Hospital Los Angeles
Children's Hospital of Philadelphia
Children's Mercy Kansas City
Children's National Hospital
Cincinnati Children's
City of Hope
Cleveland Clinic
Cook Children's Health Care System
Dignity Health International
Gillette Children's Specialty Healthcare
Henry Ford Health System
Hospital for Special Surgery
Houston Methodist
Indiana University Health
Johns Hopkins Medicine International
Keck Medicine of the University of Southern California
Kennedy Krieger Institute
Massachusetts General Hospital
Mayo Clinic
MD Anderson Cancer Center
MedStar Georgetown University Hospital
Memorial Healthcare System
Memorial Hermann–Texas Medical Center & TIRR Memorial Hermann
Memorial Sloan Kettering Cancer Center
Moffitt Cancer Center
Mount Sinai Health System
Nationwide Children's Hospital
New York University (NYU) Langone Health
NewYork-Presbyterian
Nicklaus Children's Hospital
Northwell Health
Northwestern Medicine
Ochsner Health System
Penn Medicine
Rush University Medical Center
Sharp HealthCare
Stanford Medicine
Texas Children's Hospital
The James Cancer Hospital at the Ohio State University
The Paley Institute at St. Mary's Medical Center
The Shirley Ryan AbilityLab
UChicago Medicine
University Hospitals Cleveland Medical Center
University of California, Los Angeles (UCLA) Health
University of California, San Diego (UCSD) Health
University of California, San Francisco (UCSF) Health
University of Pittsburgh Medical Center (UPMC) and Children's Hospital of Pittsburgh of UPMC
Washington University School of Medicine in St. Louis
Yale International Medicine Program

References

Hospital networks in the United States